"Jump to Love" is a song recorded by Christine Anu. It was released in September 2000 as the second single from her second studio album, Come My Way (2000). The song peaked at number 58 and remained in the top 100 for 16 weeks.

A second, limited edition version was released in November 2000, a double A-sided single with "My Island Home", following Anu's performance of this at the Closing ceremony of the 2000 Summer Olympics in Sydney on 1 October.

Track listings
 CD Single 1 (MUSH019592)
 "Jump to Love" - 3:59
 "Come My Way" - 3:38
 "Jump to Love" (L'more Remix) - 7:22
 "Jump to Love" (Propaganda Klann Remix) - 4:27

 CD Single 2 (MUSH019962)
 "Jump to Love (Radio Urban Mix)" - 3:34
 "Come My Way" - 3:38
 "Jump to Love" - 3:59
 "Island Home"(Earth Beat) - 3:48

Chart positions

References

2000 songs
2000 singles
Mushroom Records singles
Christine Anu songs
Songs written by Paul Kelly (Australian musician)
Songs written by Stuart Crichton
Songs written by Christine Anu